George Luke Smith (December 11, 1837 – July 9, 1884) was from 1873 to 1875 a U.S. Representative for Louisiana's 4th congressional district, which encompasses the state's third largest city, Shreveport, Louisiana.

Born in New Boston in Hillsborough County in southern New Hampshire, Smith completed preparatory studies and attended Union College in Schenectady, New York.

During the American Civil War, he served in the Union Army. At the close of the war, he relocated to  Shreveport to engage in mercantile pursuits. He served from 1870 to 1872 as a member of the Louisiana House of Representatives during Reconstruction. He was the proprietor of  Shreveport Southwestern Telegram and president of the Shreveport Savings Bank & Trust Company.

Smith was elected as a Republican to the Forty-third Congress to fill the vacancy created by the death of Representative-elect Samuel Peters and served from November 24, 1873, until March 3, 1875. Considered a Carpetbagger, Smith was an unsuccessful candidate for reelection in 1874 to the Forty-fourth Congress and was succeeded by the Democrat William M. Levy.

Thereafter, Smith was appointed collector of customs at the port of New Orleans by U.S. President Rutherford B. Hayes, a position that he held from May 4, 1878, to February 20, 1879.
He moved to Hot Springs, Hot Springs, Arkansas, to engage in the real estate business until his death there.

He is interred at the West Street Cemetery in Milford, New Hampshire.

Smith was the last Republican to hold the 4th district House seat in Louisiana until 1988, when Jim McCrery won a special election for the position to succeed Buddy Roemer who was elected governor of Louisiana the preceding year.

External links

1837 births
1884 deaths
Members of the Louisiana House of Representatives
Union Army officers
People from New Boston, New Hampshire
Politicians from Shreveport, Louisiana
Politicians from New Orleans
Politicians from Hot Springs, Arkansas
American real estate businesspeople
Union College (New York) alumni
Businesspeople from New Orleans
Businesspeople from Arkansas
Republican Party members of the United States House of Representatives from Louisiana
Arkansas Republicans
People of New Hampshire in the American Civil War
19th-century American politicians
Burials in New Hampshire
19th-century American businesspeople